Gopal Narayan Singh is an Indian politician from the state of Bihar belonging to the Bharatiya Janata Party.

In June 2016, he was the candidate for the Rajya Sabha biennial elections for the lone seat that was to be won by BJP. He was elected unopposed on 3 June 2016.

References

Bharatiya Janata Party politicians from Bihar
Rajya Sabha members from Bihar
Living people
1943 births